Aitken College is an independent, co-education day school located in Greenvale, Victoria, Australia. It offers schooling education from Prep through to Year 12.

Aitken College is a co-educational, independent school catering for students of all faiths and religious denominations in the northwest region of Melbourne. It opened in January 1999.

It operates in association with the Uniting Church in Australia but is not governed or managed by the Church.

Students 
As of the 2022 school year, there were 1600 students. The college is divided into four smaller "schools":
 Fairview (preparatory school) - Prep to Year 2
 Cumberland (junior school) - Year 3 to Year 6
 Dunhelen (middle school) - Year 7 to Year 9
 Brookhill (senior school) - Year 10 to Year 12

Key people

Principals

Deputy Principals

Chairmen

Heads of Preparatory School, 1999–2019 (Fairview, Prep-Year 2)

Heads of Junior School, 1999–2014 (Cumberland, Year 3-5), 2015-2019 (Cumberland, Year 3-6)

Heads of Primary School, 2020 (Fairview & Cumberland, Prep to year 6)

Assistant principle (Primary), 2021-present (Fairview & Cumberland, Prep to year 6)

Heads of Secondary School 1999-2014 (Dunhelen, Year 6&7), 2015-2021 (Dunhelen, Year 7-9)

Heads of Upper Secondary School, 1999–2014 (Glen Arthur, Year 8&9)

Heads of Senior School 1999-2022 (Brookhill, Year10-12)

Assistant Principle (Secondary), 2022-present (Dunhelen & Brookhill, Year 7-12)

House system 
A house system operates in senior, middle and junior schools. Each house is named after a significant historic family from the surrounding area.  Sporting competitions are held between them each year.

Sport
Primary (Years 5-6) and Secondary (Years 7-12) students of the college participate in the summer, winter and spring seasons of the School Sports Victoria (SSV) sport competition. Choices offered for summer team sports include Cricket (boys only), Softball (girls only), Tennis and Volleyball.  Winter sports include AFL Football, Badminton, Basketball, Hockey, Netball (girls only), Soccer, Table Tennis and Touch Rugby (boys only). Students may also participate in a number of SSV individual sport competitions such as Athletics, Cross Country and Swimming. The college is particularly known for its excellence and achievement in Athletics and Cross Country.

References

External links
Aitken College website

Educational institutions established in 1999
Private secondary schools in Victoria (Australia)
Uniting Church in Australia
1999 establishments in Australia
Buildings and structures in the City of Hume